The Canton of Avion is a canton situated in the department of the Pas-de-Calais and in the Hauts-de-France region of northern France.

Composition
At the French canton reorganisation which came into effect in March 2015, the canton was expanded from 2 to 4 communes:
Acheville
Avion
Méricourt
Sallaumines

See also
Cantons of Pas-de-Calais 
Communes of Pas-de-Calais 
Arrondissements of the Pas-de-Calais department

References

Avion